Iva Bukač (born 27 November 1994) is a Croatian footballer who plays as a midfielder and has appeared for the Croatia women's national team.

Career
Bukač has been capped for the Croatia national team, appearing for the team during the UEFA Women's Euro 2021 qualifying cycle.

References

External links
 
 
 

1994 births
Living people
Croatian women's footballers
Croatia women's international footballers
Women's association football midfielders